Kevin Curren and Guy Forget were the defending champions but they competed with different partners that year, Curren with Brad Pearce and Forget with Yannick Noah.

Curren and Pearce lost in the first round to Stefan Edberg and Mats Wilander.

Forget and Noah won in the final 6–4, 6–4 against Rick Leach and Tim Pawsat.

Seeds

Draw

Final

Top half

Bottom half

External links
1987 Stella Artois Championships Doubles Draw

Doubles